Solariella peristicta is a species of sea snail, a marine gastropod mollusk in the family Solariellidae.

Distribution
This marine species is endemic to New Zealand and occurs off the Three Kings Islands at depths between 40 m and 805 m.

References

 Marshall B.A. (1999). A revision of the Recent Solariellinae (Gastropoda: Trochoidea) of the New Zealand region. The Nautilus 113(1): 4-42

External links

 Marine Species

peristicta
Gastropods of New Zealand
Gastropods described in 1999